Martina Di Centa (born 6 March 2000) is an Italian cross-country skier. She is the daughter of Italian cross-country skier Giorgio Di Centa. She competed in the  10 km classical, 15 km skiathlon, and 30 km freestyle at the 2022 Winter Olympics.

Cross-country skiing results
All results are sourced from the International Ski Federation (FIS).

Olympic Games

World Championships

World Cup

Season standings

References

External links

2000 births
Living people
Italian female cross-country skiers
Cross-country skiers at the 2022 Winter Olympics
Olympic cross-country skiers of Italy